Diario Extra may refer to

 Diario Extra (Costa Rica), a tabloid magazine in Costa Rica
 Diario Extra (Ecuador), a newspaper in Ecuador